Leander Chapman was the Speaker of the Michigan House of Representatives in 1849.

Early life 
The date of Chapman's birth is unknown, but is estimated to be around 1804 or 1810 in Oswego County, New York. Chapman moved to Jackson County, Michigan in 1835, the second lawyer to do so.

Career 
Chapman served as a probate judge from 1836 to 1840, and as a prosecuting attorney in 1838. Chapman unsuccessfully ran for the Michigan House of Representatives in 1840. Chapman was Jackson County Treasurer from 1842 to 1846. In 1845, Chapman served as president of the Jackson County Bar. In either 1846 or 1847, Chapman wass appointed Commissioner of the Land Office in Detroit. Chapman was sworn in as a member of the Michigan House of Representatives from the Jackson County district from 1849 to 1850, serving as Speaker of the Michigan House of Representatives during his single term. Chapman was appointed Surveyor General of Ohio, Indiana, and Michigan by President Franklin Pierce.

Chapman later moved to Cedar Falls, Iowa. He continued to practice law in Iowa. Chapman served as the Democratic nominee for the United States House of Representatives seat representing Iowa's 6th district in 1864.

Personal life 
Chapman was married to Caroline, and together they had two children. Chapman was a Freemason and Episcopalian.

Death 
According to Chapman's obituary published by The Courier, a newspaper in Waterloo, Iowa, Chapman died in Cedar Falls on September 3, 1872. According to a book entitled History of Jackson County, Michigan published in 1881, Chapman died in either 1863 or 1864.

References 

1872 deaths
American surveyors
Iowa lawyers
Michigan lawyers
American Freemasons
County treasurers in Michigan
Speakers of the Michigan House of Representatives
Democratic Party members of the Michigan House of Representatives
Iowa Democrats
Episcopalians from Michigan
People from Jackson County, Michigan
People from Cedar Falls, Iowa
Pierce administration personnel
19th-century American Episcopalians
19th-century American politicians
19th-century American lawyers
19th-century American judges